Scruff may refer to:

 Scruff (anatomy), a loose, non-sensitive area of skin by which a mother can carry her young
 Scruff (app), a mobile application for gay men
 Scruff (TV series), a Spanish children's animated television series
 Scruff Connors (1952–2016), Canadian radio broadcaster
 Mr. Scruff (born 1972), British DJ and artist

See also
 Scruffy (disambiguation)
 The Scruffs